Carlos Fernando Morán Guillén (born 19 July 1984) is a Honduran football midfielder, who most recently played for F.C. Motagua in the Honduran national league.

Club career
Morán started his professional career at hometown club Victoria and stayed with them for eight years, before joining F.C. Motagua before the 2011 Clausura.

International career
Morán made his debut for Honduras in a February 2005 UNCAF Nations Cup match against Nicaragua and has earned a total of 7 caps, scoring no goals. He has represented his country at the 2005 UNCAF Nations Cup as well as at the 2005 CONCACAF Gold Cup.

His final international was a July 2005 CONCACAF Gold Cup match against Panama.

References

External links 

 Profile - Diez

1984 births
Living people
People from La Ceiba
Association football midfielders
Honduran footballers
Honduras international footballers
2005 UNCAF Nations Cup players
2005 CONCACAF Gold Cup players
C.D. Victoria players
F.C. Motagua players
Liga Nacional de Fútbol Profesional de Honduras players